Chindu Bhagavatam is a drama art widely performed in Telangana, India. Chindu Bhagavatam is distantly related to Kattaikkuttu, Terukkuttu, Yakshaganam type of folk theater art forms in other parts of south India. The art form has evolved over time from being restricted to a small sub-sect within a community to being performed all over the region and utilised by the State government.

History
The art goes that within the ‘Madiga’ community, a sect considered itself ‘Pedda Madiga’ (Big madiga) and another sect that was living on begging, performing yakshaganas, as ‘Chinna Madigas’, (Small madiga). These Chindu Bhagavatas were not permitted to perform beyond their own community. A lot has changed since then. Chindu Yellamma, a respected icon from Nizamabad, was invited to perform with her troupe at Ravindra Bharathi by the erstwhile Dance Academy headed by Nataraja Ramakrishna. The academy had also published a small booklet on this art and the Chindu Bhagavatas at that time. 

The word ‘Chindu’ in Telugu means ‘jump’. As their presentation is interspersed with leaps and jumps, it gained the name of Chindu Bhagavatam. Most of the stories narrated are from ‘Bhagavatam’. Gaddam Sammayya, a leader of these troupes, claims that though the Chindu Bhagavatas were seen as a lowly section of society, they trace their origin to Jamba Mahamuni, and believe their clan is the most ancient sect. "Hence most of our dramas open with 'Jamba Puranam' with the opening pallavi that goes ‘Ekkuvani Mari Palukabokumura, Ekkuvevvaru Mari Telisi Palukumura’ (don’t speak of being high, speak knowing who is higher)," he says.

Present
Contemporary plays based on the Bhagavata were passed down generations orally until writers like Chevirala Bhagayya, Jilla Venkatadasu, Burugupally Venkatanarasayya Panthulu, Yadavadasu wrote some plays on new themes, made the script more sophisticated, adding some verses to meter thus making it a full-fledged theatrical performance. "Some of us are educated up to ‘Peddabalasiksha’ and can read the script and memorise it," Sammayya informs.

Currently there are 800 Chindu Bhagavatam troupes , each troupe is made skilled performers , typically all male. Everyone is trained in the art of make up, singing and playing musical instruments like harmonium, cymbals and Dholak. Sammayya says every family of their caste gets trained in the Yakshagana prakriya. "We spend our lives in learning and staging many mythological themes. Believe us, we are armed with more than 300 themes," he claims. They learn to render songs and verses and verbal dramatic bits. All skill performers are in Yakshagana format. The stage for them is any special place in a village - be it under trees or at cross roads. People come in large numbers to watch. Sometimes they present ‘Gadies’ of Deshmukhs or ‘Chavadi Kottaalu’ you find in rural areas in the Telangana region. Plays run throughout the night till dawn. Makeup is done on the spot.

They keep a picture of Goddess Yellamma before them and move around the villages to collect whatever the villagers give, be they clothes or food. Generally they avoid performances in monsoon season. When not performing, they work as farm labour or do fishing and rope making. Thanks to the Government’s developmental and welfare programmes, the services of Chindu Bhagavatas are borrowed to propagate programmes like protection of environment, sanitation, family planning, literacy, awareness of TB, AIDS and so on. They incorporate these messages as a part of the Yakshaganam to make them entertaining, says Sammayya. "We are able to survive because of the remuneration government gives us for this", he says.
The State Culture Council and department of Culture have promised to give pension to old and indigent artistes of Chindu Bhagavatulu and also send these troupes to other parts of the state. However, the immediate help they can render is to fund for their costumes and accessories. However they plead for houses as part of ‘Gruha Samaudaya Pathakam’ (group housing
scheme) in different mandals in the Telangana region.

References

Culture of Telangana
Telugu language
Theatre in India